United States v. Trans-Missouri Freight Association, 166 U.S. 290 (1897), was a United States Supreme Court case holding that the Sherman Act (which was an antitrust measure that prohibited anticompetitive behavior in commerce) applied to the railroad industry, even though the U.S. Congress had enacted a comprehensive regime of regulations for that industry.

Background
Various railroad companies had formed an organization to regulate prices charged for transportation. The federal government charged these companies with violating the Sherman Act, and the railroad companies replied that they were not in violation of the act because their organization was designed to keep prices low, not to push them higher. The companies also contended that Congress had not intended the Sherman Act to apply to them, because there were already a wide array of laws governing the railroads.

Opinion of the Court
The Supreme Court held that the Sherman Act prohibited all such combinations, irrespective of the purpose. The railroad association was price fixing under the per se approach. Competition should determine the reasonable rate, not agreements between companies.

See also

US antitrust law
List of United States Supreme Court cases, volume 166

References

External links
 
 

1897 in United States case law
United States antitrust case law
United States Supreme Court cases
United States Supreme Court cases of the Fuller Court
Freight transport